Hariom Yadav  is an Indian politician and served as MLA of the Sirsaganj Assembly constituency from 2012 to 2022 as member of the Samajwadi Party. In March 2022, he contested Sirsaganj constituency as a member of the Bharatiya Janata Party (BJP) but lost the election.

Early life and education
Hariom Yadav was born in Garhshan a village in the Firozabad district. He attended the Narain College and attained Bachelor of Arts degree.

Family

Hariom Yadav is married to Ramsakhi Yadav. His brother Ram Prakash's daughter, Mridula Yadav is married to Ranvir Singh Yadav, the nephew of Mulayam Singh Yadav.

Mridula Yadav is Block Pramukh of Saifai and mother of former Lok Sabha MP Tej Pratap Singh Yadav.

Political career
Hariom Yadav has been an MLA for three terms. He represented the Sirsaganj constituency as a member of the Samajwadi Party political party.

Positions held

See also
 Shikohabad (Assembly constituency)
 Sirsaganj (Assembly constituency)
 Sixteenth Legislative Assembly of Uttar Pradesh
 Uttar Pradesh Legislative Assembly

References 

Uttar Pradesh MLAs 2002–2007
Uttar Pradesh MLAs 2012–2017
Uttar Pradesh MLAs 2017–2022
People from Firozabad district
Dr. Bhimrao Ambedkar University alumni
1957 births
Living people
Pragatisheel Samajwadi Party (Lohiya) politicians